WQGN-FM (105.5 MHz "Q105") is a commercial radio station licensed to Groton, Connecticut, and serving the New London - Groton area.  It broadcasts a CHR/Top 40 radio format and is owned by Cumulus Media.  WQGN carries several nationally syndicated shows including The Kidd Kraddick Morning Show and the Carson Daly Top 30.  The radio studios and offices are located on Governor Winthrop Boulevard in New London.

WQGN-FM has an effective radiated power (ERP) of 3,000 watts.  The station's transmitter is on Briar Hill Road near Gungywamp Road.  It shares the same tower as sister station WXLM 980 AM.

History
In 1971, the station signed on as WSUB-FM.  It was the FM counterpart to WSUB AM 980 (now WXLM).  Both stations were owned by the Southeastern Connecticut Broadcasting Company.  Because shipbuilding is a major industry in the area, the two stations used the call letters SUB, which stood for "submarine."

At first, WSUB-FM simulcast the Middle of the Road (MOR) programming heard on the AM station.  But after a few years, it began playing Top 40 music separate from WSUB 980 AM.  The station started with the TM studios syndicated stereo rock format. To give it a different identity, the call sign was changed to WQGN, on August 6, 1979. The station became known as Q 105.

In the early 2000s, WQGN and WSUB were owned by Citadel.  Citadel merged with Cumulus Media on September 16, 2011.

References

External links
Q105's Official Website

QGN-FM
New London, Connecticut
Mass media in New London County, Connecticut
Contemporary hit radio stations in the United States
Cumulus Media radio stations
Radio stations established in 1981
1981 establishments in Connecticut